The Skol Company produced Skol antiseptic for sunburn and Skol sunglasses from the 1920s  through the mid-1940s. Based in New York City, their products were available in the United States and Canada. George Gallowhur was president of the business. He developed Skol suntan lotion in the Austrian Alps in the 1920s. He also introduced  Skat insect repellent.

In April 1938, the firm signed a five-year contract with the J. Walter Thompson Company for car-card advertising.
The following month the Skol Company launched a nationwide campaign to promote Skol sunglasses, utilizing newspapers throughout the United
States.

Merger and sale

On November 6, 1946, the Skol Company merged with the Gallowhur Chemical Company. Gallowhur maintained his titles as president and treasurer.  The Skol business was
sold to the J.B. Williams Company in 1948. 

Gallowhur died at the age of 69 at the Miami Heart Institute in Miami, Florida, in March 1974.

References

Skol Company
Skol Company